Events from the year 1892 in Scotland.

Incumbents 

 Secretary for Scotland and Keeper of the Great Seal – The Marquess of Lothian, until 11 August; then Sir George Trevelyan, Bt

Law officers 
 Lord Advocate – Sir Charles Pearson until August; then John Blair Balfour
 Solicitor General for Scotland – Andrew Murray; then Alexander Asher

Judiciary 
 Lord President of the Court of Session and Lord Justice General – Lord Robertson
 Lord Justice Clerk – Lord Kingsburgh

Events 
 29 January – original bridge at Bonar Bridge swept away by flood
 February – Scottish Universities Commissioners publish an ordinance authorising Scottish universities to provide for the education and graduation of women for the first time
 9 April – Celtic F.C. win the Scottish Cup for the first time
 4–18 July – in the general election, Keir Hardie, standing as an independent labour candidate, wins the London seat of West Ham South
 5 July – Central Library, Aberdeen, opened by Andrew Carnegie
 6 September – Dundee Whaling Expedition begins
 8 September – Cunard liner  is launched by the Fairfield Shipbuilding and Engineering Company at Govan
 26 November – the original Jenners department store in Edinburgh is destroyed by fire
 Foundation stone of new St Cuthbert's Church, Edinburgh laid
 Scottish Church Society formed
 New Templeton's Carpet Factory building on Glasgow Green completed
 Alexander Grant develops the original recipe for McVitie's digestive biscuit in Edinburgh

Births 
 25 March – Andy Clyde, screen actor (died 1967 in the United States)
 13 April – Robert Watson-Watt, pioneer of radar (died 1973)
 11 August – Hugh MacDiarmid, poet (died 1978)
 2 October – Mab Copland Lineman, attorney in the United States (died 1957 in the United States)
 14 November – Nora Connolly O'Brien, Irish political activist, daughter of James Connolly (died 1981 in Ireland)
 18 November – D. E. Stevenson, romantic novelist (died 1973)
 14 December – Jimmy McColl, footballer (died 1978)
 25 December – Dorothy Johnstone, painter (died 1980 in Wales)

Deaths 
 28 August – William Forbes Skene, historian and antiquary (born 1809)
 22 September – George Sutherland-Leveson-Gower, 3rd Duke of Sutherland (born 1828 in London)
 23 September – George Grub, church historian (born 1812)
 5 October – Alexander Carnegie Kirk, mechanical engineer (born 1830)

The arts
 October – first Gaelic mòd, predecessor of the Royal National Mòd, held in Oban
 7 November – Empire Palace Theatre opens in Edinburgh, designed for impresario Edward Moss by Frank Matcham

See also 
 Timeline of Scottish history
 1892 in the United Kingdom

References 

 
Years of the 19th century in Scotland
Scotland
1890s in Scotland